Het Klokhuis (Dutch for "The Applecore") is a daily documentary show for primary school children and young teenagers produced by ntr of the Netherlands. It first aired in 1988. It is broadcast every weekday at 18:25 on NPO 3 and lasts about 15 minutes. The subjects vary widely. Quite often, factories are visited, where a complete production process is explained. The serious parts are interspersed with sketches, which sometimes have aspects that only adults would understand, whilst still remaining funny for children. 

In 1990, there were plans to discontinue the show due to high costs, but after protests and questions asked in the Dutch parliament, it was decided to keep the show. In a later year, a bill was made to discontinue the production company, which endangered the show again. But the fall of the Dutch parliament on June 30, 2006 put a halt to this and the show continued running.

In 2013, Het Klokhuis celebrated 25 years. For this occasion, the viewers were asked to vote for their favorite episode, to create a top ten with the best episode. This top ten was broadcast in a special three-hour program. After this, there was a live show, in which guests who had made, presented or cooperated with Het Klokhuis were interviewed live.

External links
Official site

Dutch children's television series
Dutch television sketch shows
1988 Dutch television series debuts
Educational television series
NPO 3 original programming